Shamsuddin Ahmed is a Bangladesh Nationalist Party politician and the former Member of Parliament of Naogaon-5.

Career
Ahmed was elected to parliament from Naogaon-5 as a Bangladesh Nationalist Party candidate in 1991 and 1996.

References

Bangladesh Nationalist Party politicians
Living people
5th Jatiya Sangsad members
6th Jatiya Sangsad members
7th Jatiya Sangsad members
Year of birth missing (living people)
People from Naogaon District